Yuhuangdong Grottoes, or Yuhuang Grottoes, named after the statue of the Jade Emperor carved inside the cave, are Chinese Taoist stone sculptures, located on a cliff at the southern foot of Makong Mountain (麻空山), Fengxianggang Township (枫香岗乡), Yongding District, Zhangjiajie City, Hunan Province.

Distribution
Yuhuangdong Grottoes, 10 kilometers away from the urban area, are distributed on a section of precipice about 300 meters long from east to west and more than 130 meters high.

History
Yuhuangdong Grottoes were excavated by Li Jingkai (李京开), a Qing Dynasty Yongding country gentry (乡绅), and In 1799, these grottoes began to be constructed in 1799 and it took eight years to complete in 1807.

References

Grottoes
Caves of Hunan
Taoist art
Taoist architecture
Taoist buildings
Chinese sculpture
Religion in Hunan
Qing dynasty architecture
Sacral architecture
1807 establishments
History of Zhejiang
19th-century establishments in China